Battle of Kachhi was fought between His Highness The Khan of Kalat Mir Abdullah Khan Brauhvi and Main Noor Mohammad Kalhoro Amir of Sindh to establish their rule in Kachhi.

In the year 1142 AH (1729 AD) Murad Kaleri , was appointed by Main Noor Mohammad Kalhoro as an agent in charge of Siwí, and brought into subjection powerful chiefs like Jafar Khan Magsí, the land owner of Ganjobah, Ali Mardan Abro and Ibrahim Khan Abro chiefs of Nausharo, Kachhi, Mahyan Eri and Lahná Machhi, big land owners of Bhag Nari, Kala Khan and other chiefs and owners of Dhadhar.

In 1144 AH (1731 AD) a Baloch force under Khan of Kalat Mir Abdullah Khan in open contravention of the terms of the peace, invaded the land of Káchi and plundered that part of the country.  To counter the attack Main Noor Mohammad Kalhoro himself marched out and encamped at Ládkanah. From there he dispatched some chiefs to fight with Khan of Kalat Mir Abdullah Khan Brauhvi. At Jandehar, where Khan of Kalat Mir Abdullah Khan  had arrived in advance.  Mir Abdullah Khan was killed in the battle.

Mir Abdullah was eventually slain in a fight with the Kalhoras at Jandrihar near Sanni in Kachhi. During the reign of Mir Abdullah's successor, Mir Muhabbat, Nadir Shah rose to power; and the Ahmadzai ruler obtained through him in 1740 the cession of Kachhi, in compensation for the blood(khoonbaha) of Mir Abdullah and the men who had fallen with him.

References 

This article includes content derived from "History of Sind - translated from Persian books" by Mirza Kalichbeg Fredunbeg (1853–1929), published in Karachi in 1902 and now in the public domain.
- Imperial Gazetteer of India, v. 6, p. 277.

Military history of Pakistan
History of Sindh
Balochistan
Khanate of Kalat